Prince Antoni Wilhelm Radziwiłł (31 March 183316 December 1904) was a member of the Polish-Lithuanian nobility and a General of the Artillery in the Prussian Army. He was the nephew of Princess Elisa Radziwiłł, the first love of their kinsman King William I of Prussia, who would later become the first German Emperor.

Early life
Born the eldest son of Prince Wilhelm Paweł Radziwiłł (1797–1870), a General of the Infantry in the Prussian Army, and his second wife Countess Mathilde of Clary und Aldringen (1806–1896), Antoni was a descendant of the powerful magnate family of Radziwiłł, who owned large estates in Silesia and Posen, as well as Russia; his uncle was the Polish statesman Prince Bogusław Fryderyk Radziwiłł. He was also related to the Prussian royal family through King Frederick William I, whose granddaughter Princess Louise was married to Antoni's grandfather Antoni Henryk, Governor of Posen.

Career

Upon his graduation from the Französisches Gymnasium Berlin in 1852, Antoni joined the military firstly as part of the Guards Artillery Regiment, before serving an 8-month internship with the 3rd Artillery Regiment in Magdeburg. During that time he accompanied Prince Frederick William to Moscow to witness the coronation of Tsar Alexander II of Russia in August 1856. Between 1858 and 1861 he enrolled in the military academy, rising to the rank of captain.

In 1866 Prince Radziwiłł participated in the Austro-Prussian War as part of the General Staff of Prince August of Württemberg's Guard Corps, after which he was appointed personal aide-de-camp to King William I. He became a close confidant of the king, often accompanying him on important events. He would play a major role in the future Franco-Prussian War, as he was the one to deliver the Ems Dispatch to Count Benedetti, as well as announcing the ceasefire after the Battle of Sedan on 2 September 1870 and witnessing the proclamation of the German Empire at Versailles.

In 1885, William I appointed him to the rank of Adjutant general.

Later life
From 1871 to 1888, Prince Radziwiłł was a member of the Prussian House of Lords. He and his wife ran a popular salon in Berlin, where they entertained many Polish politicians and members of the Catholic Center Party. This earned him the distrust of Chancellor Otto von Bismarck during the Kulturkampf, which was exacerbated by the fact that Antoni's cousin Ferdynand Radziwiłł was a member of the Polish Party.

He was promoted to General of the Infantry by Emperor Frederick III, upon the latter's accession to the throne, while retaining his position as Adjutant. Upon Frederick's death in 1888, however, he was dismissed by the next Emperor, William II, who on 22 March 1889 granted him the "duty title" of General of the Artillery.

Personal life

On 3 October 1857, Radziwiłł married Marie de Castellane, the daughter of French aristocrats Henri de Castellane and Pauline de Talleyrand-Périgord, in Sagan. They had four children:

 Prince Jerzy Fryderyk Radziwiłł (1860–1914), who married Maria Róża Branicki (1863–1941), daughter of Władysław Michał Branicki, owner of a large estate in Biała Cerkiew.
 Princess Elżbieta Matylda Radziwiłł (1861–1950), who married Count Roman Potocki, a son of Count Alfred Józef Potocki, Minister-President of Austria, and Princess Maria Klementyna Sanguszko.
 Princess Helena Augusta Radziwiłł (1874–1958), who married Count Józef Mikołaj Potocki, another son of Count Alfred Józef Potocki.
 Prince Stanisław Wilhelm Radziwiłł (1880–1920), who married Princess Dolores Radziwiłł, a daughter of Prince Dominic Maria Radziwiłł and sister of Prince Hieronim Mikołaj Radziwiłł (who married Archduchess Renata of Austria).

Radziwiłł died in Berlin in 1904; his funeral was held at St. Hedwig's Cathedral, and attended by the Kaiser himself. His remains were interred at the family crypt in Nyasvizh in 1905. His widow died at the Kleinitz Palace in Lower Silesia in July 1915.

Descendants
Through his eldest son, he was a grandfather of Prince Albrecht Radziwiłł (1885–1935), who married American heiress Dorothy Evelyn Deacon, daughter of Edward Parker Deacon, in 1910. They divorced and she married Count Paul Pálffy ab Erdöd.

Through his daughter Elżbieta, he was a grandfather of Count Alfred Antoni Potocki (1886–1958) and Count Jerzy Antoni Potocki (1889–1961), the Polish ambassador to the United States from 1936 to 1940.

Honours

Decorations and awards
German honours

Foreign honours

Military appointments
 À la suite of the 1st Guards Field Artillery Regiment

References

Bibliography
 Ryszard Dzieszyński, Sedan tysiąc osiemset siedemdziesiąt, Bellona 2009, p. 18.
 Petra Wilhelmy-Dollinger, The Berlin salons. Berlin 2000. p. 251

External links 
 Biography at iPSB.

1833 births
1904 deaths
20th-century Polish nobility
Radziwiłł family
German people of Polish descent
Polish people of German descent
People from Teplice
Prussian Army personnel
Generals of Artillery (Prussia)
Members of the Prussian House of Lords
Recipients of the Iron Cross (1870), 2nd class
Recipients of the Military Merit Order (Bavaria)
Recipients of the Military Merit Cross (Mecklenburg-Schwerin)
Commanders of the Order of Franz Joseph
Grand Officers of the Order of Saints Maurice and Lazarus
Recipients of the Order of the Crown (Italy)
Grand Crosses of the Order of Aviz
Grand Crosses of the Order of the Star of Romania
Recipients of the Order of the White Eagle (Russia)
Recipients of the Order of St. Anna, 2nd class
Recipients of the Order of St. Vladimir, 3rd class
Commanders Grand Cross of the Order of the Sword